Yulia Volodymyrivna Shevchuk (born  25 June 1998) is a Ukrainian footballer, who plays as a midfielder for Ankara BB Fomget GS in the Turkish Women's Football Super League ,and for the Ukraine women's national team.

Private lisfe 
Yulia Volodymyrivna Shevchuk was born in Kivertsi, Ukraine on 25 June 20--1998.

Club career 
She played football in the Manevychi-based women's football club Osvita-Volynyanka. In 2014, she joined the Rodyna-Lyceum in Kostopil, where she played for two seasons.
 
She became a member of WFC Zhytlobud-1 Kharkiv in 2016. She made her European Cup debut on 23 August the same year in a match of the 2016–17 UEFA Women's Champions League qualifying round against the SFK Rīga from Latvia.

In March 2022, she moved to Turkey, and signed with Ankara BB Fomget GS to play in the Women's Super League.

International career 
She was a member of the  Ukraine U17 and  U19 teams, before she was admitted to the  A team. On 19 October 2016, she made her debut in the national team in a friendly match with the Hungarian national team.

References

External links 
Yuliia Shevchuk @ UEFA website
Yulia Shevchuk @ WFPL website 

1998 births
Living people
Sportspeople from Volyn Oblast
Ukrainian women's footballers
Women's association football midfielders
WFC Zhytlobud-1 Kharkiv players
Ukraine women's international footballers
Ukrainian expatriate women's footballers
Ukrainian expatriate sportspeople in Turkey
Expatriate women's footballers in Turkey
Turkish Women's Football Super League players
Fomget Gençlik ve Spor players